Chiroqchi is a city in Qashqadaryo Region, Uzbekistan. It is the capital of Chiroqchi District. Its population is 23,800 (2016).

References

Populated places in Qashqadaryo Region
Cities in Uzbekistan